Azucaron pineapples (also called azucaron) are very sweet pineapples found in Honduras and other parts of central and South America. Is quite resistant to droughts and its fruit is of conic shape.

Description

Its standard weight is between 800 and 1,400 grams.

Pulp color is of intense yellow and is very juicy.

References

Agriculture in Honduras
Pineapples
Food plant cultivars